This is a list of wars involving Georgia, by Georgians or regular armies during periods when independent Georgian states existed, from antiquity to the present day. It also includes wars fought outside of Georgia by the Georgian military.

The list gives the name, the date, combatants, and the result of these conflicts following this legend:



Diaokhi

Colchis and Iberia

Early Medieval fragmentation

Kingdom of Georgia

Kingdoms and principalities

The Social-Democratic Georgia

Georgian SSR

Republic of Georgia

See also
 List of wars involving Russia
 List of wars involving Armenia
 List of wars involving Azerbaijan
 List of Georgian battles

 
Georgia (country)
Wars